The North Carolina Museum of Art (NCMA) is an art museum in Raleigh, North Carolina. It opened in 1956 as the first major museum collection in the country to be formed by state legislation and funding. Since the initial 1947 appropriation that established its collection, the Museum has continued to be a model of enlightened public policy with free admission to the permanent collection. Today, it encompasses a collection that spans more than 5,000 years of artistic work from antiquity to the present, an amphitheater for outdoor performances, and a variety of celebrated exhibitions and public programs. The Museum features over 40 galleries as well as more than a dozen major works of art in the nation's largest museum park with 164-acres (0.66 km2). One of the leading art museums in the American South, the NCMA recently completed a major expansion winning international acclaim for innovative approaches to energy-efficient design.

History
In 1924, the North Carolina State Art Society formed to generate interest in creating an art museum for the state.  In 1928 the society acquired funds and 75 paintings were first displayed in a series of temporary art exhibition spaces in the Agriculture Building in Raleigh in 1929.  In 1939, NCMA was moved to the former Supreme Court building.
In 1947 the state legislature appropriated $1 million to purchase a collection of artworks for the people of North Carolina. The money was used to purchase 139 European and American works. The Samuel H. Kress Foundation matched the appropriation with a gift of 71 works, primarily from the Italian Renaissance. The 1947 state earmarking of funds for an art collection was the first in the United States. Alice Willson Broughton, the former First Lady of North Carolina, helped procure funding for the collection.

Morgan Street Location
On April 6, 1956, the museum opened in the renovated State Highway Division Building on Morgan Street in downtown Raleigh, the state capital, W. R. Valentiner became the museum's first director. Ben Williams was the first curator of the museum. In 1961, the legislature separated the museum from the Art Society, making it a state agency jointly governed by the state and a board of trustees. Ten years later, NCMA became an entity under what is now the North Carolina Department of Natural and Cultural Resources.

Blue Ridge Road and the Stone Building
In 1967, the present-day Blue Ridge Road site was chosen as the location for a new building, as the museum had outgrown the Morgan Street location. Designed by Edward Durrell Stone and Associates of New York and Holloway-Reeves Architects of North Carolina, the new building opened in 1983, under the directorship of Edgar Peters Bowron (1981-1985). Stone used spatial experimentation with pure geometric form for the museum by using a square as a basic unit and designing the entire site by manipulating the square form. This was Stone's last major design prior to his death. After he died in 1978, the exterior was changed from white marble to red brick.

Expansion
In April 2010 the museum opened the new  West Building, designed by New York-based architects Thomas Phifer and Partners as part of an expansion initiative. The single-story structure, surrounded by sculpture gardens and pools, was created to feature the museum's permanent collection as well as more than 100 new works of art acquired on the occasion of the expansion. Highlights include a gift of 30 Auguste Rodin sculptures and work by artists Roxy Paine, Ursula von Rydingsvard, El Anatsui, Jaume Plensa, Jackie Ferrara, Ellsworth Kelly, and David Park. The project also transformed the museum's East Building into a center for temporary exhibitions, education and public programs, public events, and administrative functions. The project cost $72.3 million. The exterior walls of the West Building are covered with anodized aluminum panels that are canted two degrees back from vertical with seams covered by highly polished steel bands. The roof of the West Building includes parabolic-shaped  by  coffers, which admit natural light.

Permanent collection

The museum's permanent collection includes European paintings from the Renaissance to the 19th century, Egyptian funerary art, sculpture and vase painting from ancient Greece and Rome, American art of the 18th through 20th centuries, and international contemporary art. Other strengths include African, ancient American, pre-Columbian, and Oceanic art, and Jewish ceremonial objects.

African
The museum's African collection originated in the 1970s with historical material from the 19th and 20th centuries, including important items from the Benin Kingdom. Later acquisitions expanded regional coverage to include other parts of sub-Saharan Africa with an eye toward assembling works that demonstrated a particular ethnic style, such as those of the Chokwe and Luba peoples of central Africa. Though much of the collection is rooted in traditional media such as wood, metal, and textiles and derives from established creative traditions, many works date from the mid-20th century and give insight into global exchanges that have taken place on the continent for centuries.

American
The museum's American art collection encompasses paintings and sculpture from the late colonial period (mid-18th century) to the advent of modern art in the early 20th century, beginning with three imposing portraits by John Singleton Copley and concluding with paintings by leading American impressionists. In between, the collection addresses many of the themes and subjects of American art history, such as the celebration of wilderness and the search for a national identity; the conflicts over race, immigration, and social class; and the rapid evolution of society from Jefferson's republic of farmers to Rockefeller's industrial dynamo. In December 2018, the museum acquired the 1865 sculpture Saul by William Wetmore Story.

Ancient American
The ancient American collection features art from three distinct areas of the Western Hemisphere: Mesoamerica, Central America, and the Andes. The ancient American gallery focuses on Mesoamerica, particularly the art of the ancient Maya. Known for their achievements in science and the arts, the Maya dominated the region for most of two millennia. The museum's collection reflects their religious beliefs, sport, ritual, and daily life.

Egyptian
Although comprising only 38 artifacts, the ancient Egyptian art collection at the North Carolina Museum of Art represents the major periods of ancient Egyptian history, from the Predynastic (Naqada I, 4000–3500 BCE) to the Roman (30 BCE – 642 CE) periods. The Museum's oldest artifact is a black-topped red ceramic jar handmade approximately 6,000 years ago. All periods combined, the collection's strength resides in funerary material, which includes the painted coffins of Djed Mut and Amunred, servant statues for chores in the afterlife (called shabtis), and a canopic jar that once contained the mummified liver of a man named Qeny. The remainder of the collection focuses on the many gods worshiped in Egypt.

European

The museum's strength lies in its European collection. Of the 139 paintings and sculptures purchased with the original appropriation of funds, 123 were European. When these paintings were augmented by the 75 primarily Italian paintings and sculptures given to the museum by the Samuel H. Kress Foundation in 1961, they created a European collection that is recognized as one of the finest in the United States. The gallery is primarily a collection of paintings such as Virgin and Child in a Landscape by Cima da Conegliano but also includes a number of noteworthy sculptures, including more than 30 bronzes by Auguste Rodin some of which live in the Museum's Rodin Garden.

British, Spanish, and French Post–1600
The museum possesses a number of British portraits, most of which are installed in a gallery devoted to European portraiture and its early American counterpart. The collection features important works by Paul van Somer, Anthony van Dyck, Francis Cotes, Sir William Beechey, Thomas Gainsborough, and Sir Henry Raeburn. The museum's French and Spanish collections include portraits and still lifes by Boudin, Millet, Pissarro, and Monet.

Italian
The museum's collection of Italian paintings is one of its most robust. Highlights include a gallery devoted to altarpieces and devotional works from the 16th through 18th centuries, paintings by Titian and Raphael, and 17th-century baroque art.

Northern European
The museum's Northern European collection comprises a small but select group of Northern Renaissance paintings and sculptures, an important collection of 17th-century Dutch and Flemish paintings, and a Flemish baroque kunstkamer inspired by 17th-century examples. The 17th-century Dutch and Flemish collections are larger in number and include works by Hendrick Ter Brugghen, Jan Steen, Jan Lievens, Jacob van Ruisdael, and Govaert Flinck, Jan Brueghel the Elder, Peter Paul Rubens, Gerard Seghers, Anthony van Dyck, Jacob Jordaens, and Frans Snyders.

Modern (to circa 1960)
In West Building the museum's modern collection occupies several rooms with works by the foremost German modern artists of the early 20th century such as Franz Kline and Lyonel Feininger as well first generation of American modernists such as Alberto Giacometti. Cubist and surrealist pieces by Paul Delvaux and Joseph Cornell as well as other Modern masters such as Richard Diebenkorn, Andrew Wyeth, and Alberto Giacometti.

Judaic

The museum's Judaic art collection celebrates the spiritual life and ceremonies of the Jewish people through ritual objects of artistic excellence. It is one of only two galleries devoted to Judaica in an American art museum. The Judaic Art Gallery features objects from the major Jewish traditions—Ashkenazic, Sephardic, and Oriental—as well as from modern Israel. All objects are designed for use in synagogue worship, observance of the Sabbath and holidays, or ceremonial occasions honoring the life cycle and Jewish home. Examples of objects that are displayed include a Menorah and Torah scrolls.

Contemporary
In recent years major acquisitions have helped build a significant collection of contemporary art. A concerted effort has been made to acquire works in new and experimental media, such as Bill Viola’s video The Quintet of Remembrance (2000) and Michal Rovner’s video installation Tfila (2004). Cultural and regional representation has also been expanded, with the museum actively acquiring works by artists of diverse backgrounds. In 2003, the museum started actively collecting contemporary photography. By 2010, the collection totaled over 200 photographs by national and international photographers, including works by Rosemary Laing, Dinh Q. Lê, Vera Lutter, and Lorna Simpson. Recent acquisitions include  Hank Willis Thomas, Kehinde Wiley, and Mickalene Thomas. Two identical figures, each with the dimensions of 377×235×245 cm, were recently set up in the museum's garden. Their title is Spiegel I and Spiegel II. They were created from white painted stainless steel in 2010 by the Spanish sculptor and artist Jaume Plensa.

The collection also includes a comprehensive survey of North Carolina artists.

Museum Park
Encompassing  of fields, woodlands, and creeks, the Museum Park features more than a dozen site-specific works of art and two miles (3 km) of trails. The campus is the largest museum art park in North America. In the warm weather months, outdoor movies and concerts are presented at the Joseph M. Bryan, Jr., Amphitheater.

The museum's contemporary art program extends into the landscape surrounding the museum, where artists have created both temporary and permanent site-specific works of art in the Museum Park. , art on view in the Park includes works by Thomas Sayre, Vollis Simpson, Martha Jackson-Jarvis, Ledelle Moe and a camera obscura entitled Cloud Chamber for the Trees and Sky by Chris Drury. Other outdoor sculptures—Ronald Bladen's Three Elements, Henry Moore's Large Spindle Piece and Large Standing Figure: Knife Edge—are installed in the gardens surrounding West Building. Picture This, part of the museum's amphitheater, is a monumental work of art designed by artist Barbara Kruger in collaboration with architects and landscape architects.

Exhibitions
Since renovations in 2010, the East Building provides a series of rotating exhibitions  featuring a NC gallery, a photography gallery, education exhibitions, and at least two traveling or temporary exhibitions on display.

Previous exhibitions
Word Up: The Intersection of Text and Image, July 22, 2012–January 20, 2013
Project 35, August 19, 2012–June 2, 2013
Edvard Munch: Symbolism in Print, September 23, 2012–February 10, 2013
Still-Life Masterpieces: A Visual Feast from the Museum of Fine Arts, Boston, October 21, 2012–January 13, 2013
John James Audubon’s The Birds of America, November 7, 2010–ongoing
A Discerning Eye: Julian T. Baker Jr. Photography Collection, June 17, 2012–December 2, 2012
Rhythms of the Heart: The Illustration of Ashley Bryan, April 15, 2012–August 19, 2012
Reflections: Portraits by Beverly McIver, December 11, 2011–June 24, 2012
Rembrandt in America, October 30, 2011–January 22, 2012
Mirror Image: Women Portraying Women, June 5–November 27, 2011
Presence/Absence, November 27, 2011–May 27, 2012
30 Americans: Contemporary African American Art Collection from the Rubell Family, March 19, 2011-September 4, 2011
Alter Ego: A Decade of Work by Anthony Goicolea, April 17–July 24, 2011
American Chronicles: The Art of Norman Rockwell, November 7, 2010–January 30, 2011
, November 7, 2010–January 30, 2011
Bob Trotman: Inverted Utopias, November 7, 2010–March 27, 2011
Fins and Feathers: Original Children’s Book Illustrations from The Eric Carle Museum of Picture Book Art, November 7, 2010–January 30, 2011
Julie Mehretu: City Sitings, August 17–November 30, 2008
Far from Home, February 17–July 13, 2008
Landscapes from the Age of Impressionism, October 21, 2007–January 20, 2008
The BIG Picture, March 18, 2007–September 2, 2007
Temples and Tombs: Treasures of Egyptian Art from The British Museum, April 14–July 8, 2007
Contemporary North Carolina Photography from the Museum's Collection, First rotation:
September 3–November 5, 2006, Second rotation: November 19, 2006–February 18, 2007
Revolution in Paint, September 17, 2006–February 11, 2007
Monet in Normandy, October 15, 2006–January 14, 2007
Common Ground: Discovering Community in 150 Years of Art
Selections from the Collection of Julia J. Norrell, May 7–July 16, 2006
Sordid and Sacred: The Beggars in Rembrandt's Etchings: Selections from the John Villarino Collection, March 5–May 28, 2006
The Potter's Eye: Art and Tradition in North Carolina Pottery, October 30, 2005–March 19, 2006
Crosscurrents: Art, Craft, and Design in North Carolina, September 25, 2005–January 8, 2006
On-line Exhibition: Winners of the In Focus Digital Photography Contest, Through December 31, 2005
Shadow Boxes: Collages of Experience and Memory, August 15–December 11, 2005
Fusion: Contemporary Glass Art from North Carolina Collections, May 8–August 7, 2005
In Focus: Contemporary Photography From The Allen G. Thomas Jr. Collection, April 3–July 17, 2005
Objects of Desire: The Museum Collects, 1994–2004, Ended March 2, 2005
Matisse, Picasso and the School of Paris: Masterpieces from The Baltimore Museum of Art, October 10, 2004–January 16, 2005
American Eden: Landscape Masterworks of the Hudson River School: From the Collection of the Wadsworth Atheneum Museum of Art, June 6–August 29, 2004
Brushes With Life: Art, Artists and Mental Illness, Ended August 15, 2004
Defying Gravity: Contemporary Art and Flight, November 2, 2003–March 7, 2004
Augustus Saint-Gaudens: American Sculptor of the Gilded Age, February 23–May 11, 2003
Accent of Africa, April 6–August 10, 2003
In Memoriam: George Bireline (1923–2002), December 18, 2002–August 3, 2003
Art in the Age of Rubens and Rembrandt, October 13, 2002–January 5, 2003
Selections from The Birds of America by John James Audubon, July 14–December 1, 2002
The Reverend McKendree Robbins Long: Picture Painter of the Apocalypse, April 7–August 25, 2002
Empire of the Sultans: Ottoman Art from the Khalili Collection, May 19–July 28, 2002
Toulouse-Lautrec: Master of the Moulin Rouge from the Collection of The Baltimore Museum of Art, November 11, 2001–February 17, 2002
Picasso, Braque, Léger: Paintings from the Collection of Mr. and Mrs. Julian H. Robertson, June 10–September 9, 2001
Xu-Bing: Reading Landscape, April 29–August 5, 2001
Stanton Macdonald-Wright and Synchromism, March 4–July 1, 2001
Is Seeing Believing, January 14– April 1, 2001
Ansel Adams, October 8, 2000–January 7, 2001
Rodin, April 16–August 13, 2000
Alphonse Mucha: The Spirit of Art Nouveau, January 31–March 28, 1999
Sinners and Saints, Darkness and Light: Caravaggio and His Dutch and Flemish Followers, September 27–December 13, 1998
Closing: The Life and Death of an American Factory
Photographs by Bill Bamberger, July 26–October 18, 1998

See also
 List of contemporary amphitheatres

References

External links
  Official Website
  ArtNC Teacher Website
  NCMA on Facebook
  NCMA on Pinterest
 NCMA on Twitter
  NCMA's Untitled Blog
 A Life, Still: NCMA College Exhibition
 Triangle Painting
 Professional Painting Raleigh
Virtual tour of the North Carolina Museum of Art provided by Google Arts & Culture

Museums in Raleigh, North Carolina
Art museums and galleries in North Carolina
Edward Durell Stone buildings
Art museums established in 1956
1956 establishments in North Carolina
Egyptological collections in the United States
African art museums in the United States